Steve Arnette Robinson (born October 29, 1957) is an American college basketball coach. He is an assistant men's basketball coach at the University of Arizona. Robinson served as the head men's basketball coach at the University of Tulsa from 1995 to 1997 and Florida State University from 1997 to 2002. He was an assistant to Roy Williams for 26 years, including two stints at the University of Kansas (1988–1995 and 2002–2003), and at North Carolina following Williams's move from Kansas in 2003. Robinson assisted the North Carolina Tar Heels to three NCAA Division tournament titles, in 2005, 2009, and 2017.  As a head coach, Robinson led his teams to the NCAA tournament three times, twice with Tulsa and once with Florida State.  In 1997, he was named WAC Mountain Division Coach of the year.

Early life and family
Robinson grew up in Roanoke, Virginia and attended William Fleming High School. He earned his bachelor's degree in health and physical science from Radford University in 1981, followed by a master's degree in counseling in 1985. Robinson and his wife, Lisa, have four children: daughters Shauna and Kiaya and sons Tarron and Denzel. Denzel played two seasons for the Tar Heels.

Head coaching record

References

External links
 North Carolina Tar Heels bio
 Kansas Jayhawks bio

1957 births
Living people
African-American basketball coaches
African-American basketball players
American men's basketball players
Basketball coaches from Virginia
Basketball players from Virginia
Ferrum Panthers men's basketball players
Florida State Seminoles men's basketball coaches
Junior college men's basketball players in the United States
Kansas Jayhawks men's basketball coaches
North Carolina Tar Heels men's basketball coaches
Radford Highlanders men's basketball players
Sportspeople from Roanoke, Virginia
Tulsa Golden Hurricane men's basketball coaches
21st-century African-American people
20th-century African-American sportspeople